Stuart Mills (born 7 April 1990) is a Scottish professional footballer who plays, as a right winger, for Blantyre Victoria in the Scottish Junior Football Association, West Region. He has previously played in the Scottish Premier League for Hamilton Academical.

Career
Born in Glasgow, Mills began his career at Hamilton Academical, making his professional debut on 4 April 2009, against Celtic, in the Scottish Premier League. He made two more appearances for the Accies, before leaving the club to sign for junior side Kirkintilloch Rob Roy.

In June 2010, he returned to the senior game, joining Clyde. He only stayed with Clyde for a year, being released at the end of the season, after making 14 appearances in all competitions, scoring 2 goals.

Mills later returned to youth football with South Camlachie Juveniles before signing for Junior side Pollok in July 2012. He moved on to Blantyre Victoria in the summer of 2013. While playing with Blantyre Victoria he suffered a potentially career-ending injury in March 2014, and a benefit match to raise funds for him was organized.

References
General

Specific

1990 births
Living people
Scottish footballers
Hamilton Academical F.C. players
Clyde F.C. players
Kirkintilloch Rob Roy F.C. players
Pollok F.C. players
Blantyre Victoria F.C. players
Scottish Premier League players
Scottish Football League players
Scottish Junior Football Association players
Association football wingers
Footballers from Glasgow